Sociology of the body is a branch of sociology studying the representations and social uses of the human body in modern societies.

Early theories
According to Thomas Laqueur, prior to the eighteenth century the predominant model for a social understanding of the body was the "one sex model/one flesh model". It followed that there was one model of the body which differed between the sexes and races, for example, the vagina was simply seen as a weaker version of the penis and even thought to emit sperm.

This was changed by the Enlightenment. In the sixteenth century, Europe began to participate in the slave trade and in order to justify this a large quantity of literature was produced showing the deviant sexuality and savagery of the African (Fanon, 1976). In the eighteenth century, the ideas of egalitarianism and universal and inalienable rights were becoming the intellectual norm. However, they could not justify the subordination of women within this theory.

To explain these the biology of incommensurability was created. This essentially claimed that different sexes and races were better adjusted for different tasks and could therefore show the necessity of discrimination and subordination. For example, craniometry was used to show people of African descent to be less evolved than those of European descent (Gould, 1981).

This was also combined with the technological developments which were taking place, leading to people seeing the body as a machine and therefore understandable, classifiable and repairable, one of the first examples of this was the work of William Harvey in the early seventeenth century.

Another early key area of development was the Cartesian Dichotomy. This saw the mind and the body as separated and led to the principle of interaction between the two being an accepted theory on the body until the development of the Structuralist approach in the twentieth century.

The importance of studying the body 

Especially important within the sociology of the body tradition is the sociology of health and illness. This is because illness may obviously reduce the level of normal functioning of the body. Also, increasingly people in society believe that illness is prevented by fulfilling activities leading to a healthy body (thus changing one's lifestyle) such as dieting and exercise, as well as avoiding anything that can cause damage to the body, like smoking. Moreover, medical science is now able to alter our bodies through plastic surgery, transplanting organs, reproductive aids and even change in an unborn baby's genetic structure.
1

Historical physical practices

In France a lot of researchers have been working on this topic. The first one was probably Jean-Marie Brohm, writing a book titled Body and politics in 1974 (Delarge), but he has been followed by numerous authors. Georges Vigarello wrote Le Corps redressé, in 1978, Christian Pociello Sports et Société en 1981, André Rauch Le souci du corps in 1983, Jacques Gleyse (fr) Archéologie de l'Education physique au XXe siècle en France, in 1995 and L'Instrumentalisation du corps, in 1997. He is specially working on the topic of links between words and flesh.
Various journals are publishing papers in this domain in France: STAPS International Journal of Sport Science and Physical Education, Corps & Culture, Corps that could be consulted on the web. But quite all those works are not translated in English so they are difficult to access for the most of American and English researchers on the topic.

Body image and related disorders

Sociology of the body has become deeply affected by society and the way in which society views one another, which in turn results in the way in which people, as individuals, view themselves. At one end of the spectrum, there are eating disorders such as anorexia and bulimia, and on the other end, there is a growing epidemic of obesity, especially in the US. Both ideals have increased widely over the last few decades due in part to growing mass media coverage in which there are norms within society and the always growing pressure to either look and feel a certain way.

Anorexia, a disorder often defined as a "markedly reduced appetite or total aversion to food" (Definition of Anorexia, 2003). Often along with excessive exercise this is the one disorder that has led to the large increase in overly thin individuals. Along with anorexia, bulimia, "a disorder that can be defined as episodes of secretive excessive eating (binge-eating) followed by inappropriate methods of weight control, such as self-induced vomiting (purging), abuse of laxatives and diuretics, or excessive exercise" has also been an increased method used by individuals all over the world in the fight to remain sometimes deadly thin (Definition of Bulimia 2003). Both disorders are rooted in feelings of shame and desire to have control over one's body (Giddens, Duneier, Appelbaum, and Carr 2009). The individual feels inadequate and imperfect. They may have anxieties about how others perceive them which becomes a focus on feelings about their body. At that point, shedding weight becomes the means of making everything right in their world. The fact that we have a strong personal independence over our bodies in the past presents us with positive possibilities as well as new anxieties and problems (Giddens, Duneier, Appelbaum, and Carr  2009).
This idea is what sociologists call "socialization of nature", which is a phenomenon that used to be "natural", or given in nature, and have now become social and depend on our social decisions.
Obesity, the state of being well above one's normal weight, has become the other end of the distorted ideas about body image (Definition of obesity, 2001). According to the Centers for Disease Control, roughly 60 percent of adult Americans are now over weight, and an estimated 6.5 percent of American children ages six to eleven along with 5 percent of ages twelve to nineteen are overweight (Giddens, Duneier, Appelbaum, and Carr 2009). Reasons thought to be behind obesity vary widely and are often debated. Some believe it has to do with the "population being a statistical artifact, some believe that childhood obesity is due to compositional factors, and then others believe that the problems are due to something called an "obesogenic environment"." Sociologists are perplexed mostly in the persistence of negative attitudes towards overweight and obese individuals.
From the sociological perspective the interactions that have been seen to show up between society and that of obese individuals is that persons of obesity are more likely to experience employment discrimination, discrimination by health care providers, and the daily experience of teasing, insult, and shame (Giddens, Duneier, Appelbaum, and Carr 2009).

People in or who influenced sociology of the body
 Philippe Ariès
 Alexandre Baril
 Susan Bordo
 Pierre Bourdieu
 Judith Butler
 Peter Conrad
 Mary Douglas
 Norbert Elias
 Frantz Fanon
 Mike Featherstone
 Michel Foucault
 Erving Goffman
 Donna Haraway
 Julia Kristeva
 Thomas W. Laqueur
 Deborah Lupton
 Ann Oakley
 John O'Neill
 Susie Orbach
 Nikolas Rose
 Barbara Katz Rothman
 Dorothy E. Smith
 Bryan Turner

See also
 Sociology of health and illness, a subfield of sociology one of whose characteristics is that it interacts with sociology of the body more than medical sociology does

References

Body
Human body